Abbeyshrule Aerodrome is a small private airport located in south-east County Longford, Ireland, near the village of Abbeyshrule,  west north-west of Mullingar and beside the River Inny and the Royal Canal.

Located near the centre of Ireland, the aerodrome is situated in uncontrolled airspace and is clear of restricted areas. The airport is primarily used for leisure flights and is situated between urban centres such as Athlone, Longford and Mullingar.

Built on land rented out from local families such as the Mills family (Robert “Bertie” Mills€ and Mcgeoy family (Edward “Teddy” Mcgeoy). Reference was made to Edward as a building was named “The Teddy Dome”. 

The original grass airstrip at Abbeyshrule operated from 1955 to 1959, before being revived by Jimmy Byrne in the early 1970s. In 1977 a new runway was laid at the present site.

Two Registered Training Facilities (RTF), Aeroclub 2000 and Skyline Flying Club, are located at the aerodrome as are several general aviation aircraft, including a Malmö MFI-9 Junior.

On the north of the field, an assembly plant and a hangar was recently completed. The Abbeyshrule assembly plant produces the popular Czech kit planes from Urban Air, called Samba and Lambada.

References

External links

 Official website

Airports in the Republic of Ireland
Transport in County Longford
Longford (town)